Itai Tachiichi (痛い立ち位置) (English: Painful standing position) is the twenty-fourth single by the Japanese Pop-rock band Porno Graffitti. It was released on June 25, 2008.

Track listing

References

2008 singles
Porno Graffitti songs
2008 songs
SME Records singles
Song articles with missing songwriters